Nicholas or Nick Arnold may refer to:

Politicians
Nicholas Arnold (1507–1580), English courtier and politician
Nicholas Arnold (MP for Monmouthshire) (1600–1665)

Others
Nick Arnold (writer) (born 1964), British writer of science books for children
Nick Arnold (footballer) (born 1993), English association footballer
Nicky Arnstein (1879–1965), alias Nick and Nicholas Arnold
Edwin Nicholas Arnold (born 1940), British herpetologist, formerly at the Natural History Museum, London